Serving Up Richard, also known as The Guest Room, is a 2011 American horror film directed by Henry Olek, starring Ross McCall, Susan Priver and Jude Ciccolella.

Cast
 Ross McCall as Richard Rubens
 Susan Priver as Glory Hutchins
 Jude Ciccolella as Everett Hutchins
 Darby Stanchfield as Karen
 Michael Cambridge as Stanley
 Adam Kulbersh as Dennis

Release
The film opened in Manhattan on 7 September 2012.

Reception
Scott Hallam of Dread Central was rated the film 3.5 out of 5, calling it "entertaining, if not always completely believable". Neil Genzlinger of The New York Times rated the film 3 out of 5.

Chuck Bowen of Slant Magazine rated the film 1.5 stars out of 5 and wrote, "Serving Up Richard is ultimately a con itself, promising audiences disreputable vengeance only to deliver forgettable half-hearted pathos." The film received negative reviews in The Village Voice, Variety, and NPR.

References

External links
 
 

American horror films
2011 horror films